Local Hero is the debut soundtrack album by British singer-songwriter and guitarist Mark Knopfler, released in April 1983 by Vertigo Records internationally and by Warner Bros. Records in the United States. It contains music composed for the 1983 film Local Hero, produced by David Puttnam and both written and directed by Bill Forsyth.

In 1984, the album received a BAFTA award nomination for Best Score for a Film. The final track of the album, "Going Home", is played before every home game of Newcastle United F.C.. Knopfler re-recorded the song as a charity single for the 2014 Great North Run in his home city.

Background
Following a string of three multi-platinum albums with Dire Straits—Dire Straits (1978), Communiqué (1979), and Making Movies (1980)—Knopfler, the group's lead singer, guitarist, songwriter, and producer, began to look for new musical challenges and opportunities. In early 1982, his manager wrote to several film directors indicating that Knopfler was interested in writing film music. Producer David Puttnam responded, and after reviewing the Local Hero project, Knopfler accepted the job. Following the completion of Dire Straits' fourth album, Love Over Gold, recorded from 8 March to 11 June 1982, Knopfler began work on the film's music. He invited Gerry Rafferty to be the lead vocalist on the song, "The Way It Always Starts". In 2000, Rafferty invited Knopfler to provide rhythm guitar and lead fills on what would be his final studio album, Another World.

Recording
The Local Hero album was recorded in 1982 at The Power Station in New York, and Eden Studios in London. The Ceilidh scenes were recorded at Hilton Women's Royal Institute Hall near Banff, Scotland on 19 June 1982.

Critical reception

In his retrospective review for AllMusic, William Ruhlmann gave the album four and a half out of five stars, noting that Knopfler's "intricate, introspective finger-picked guitar stylings make a perfect musical complement to the wistful tone of Bill Forsyth's comedy film." Ruhlmann continued, "The low-key music picks up traces of Scottish music, but most of it just sounds like Dire Straits doing instrumentals, especially the recurring theme, one of Knopfler's more memorable melodies."

Rolling Stone magazine's contemporary review called Knopfler's film music debut an "insinuating LP of charming, cosmopolitan soundtrack music—a record that can make movies in your mind."

For the Local Hero soundtrack, Knopfler received a BAFTA award nomination for Best Score for a Film.

"Going Home" is played at Newcastle United F.C. and Aberdeen F.C. home games as the football players run out onto the pitch, as well as at the end of games at other clubs such as Burton Albion F.C. and Tranmere Rovers F.C.

Track listing
All music and lyrics were written by Mark Knopfler, except where indicated.

Personnel
Music
 Mark Knopfler – guitars, synthesizers, percussion, LinnDrum
 Alan Clark – synthesizers, piano, Hammond organ 
 Hal Lindes – rhythm guitar (3)
 Michael Brecker – saxophone (4,11,14)
 Mike Mainieri – vibes (4,11)
 Gerry Rafferty – vocals (5)
 Neil Jason – bass (4,5)
 Tony Levin – bass (11,14)
 John Illsley – bass (3)
 Eddie Gomez – bass (8)
 Steve Jordan – drums (4,5)
 Terry Williams – drums (3)
 The Acetones

Production
 Mark Knopfler – producer
 Neil Dorfsman – engineer
 Josh Abbey – assistant engineer
 Tim Palmer – assistant engineer
 Phil Vinall – assistant engineer
 Bob Ludwig – mastering at Masterdisk
 Denis Waugh – cover photo
 Frank Griffin – back cover photo

Charts

Weekly charts

Year-end charts

Certifications

References
Notes

Citations

External links
 Local Hero at Mark Knopfler official website
 

1983 debut albums
1983 soundtrack albums
Albums produced by Mark Knopfler
1980s film soundtrack albums
Mark Knopfler soundtracks
Vertigo Records soundtracks
Warner Records soundtracks